Legally, women in Andorra have equal rights under the laws of the Principality of Andorra. Politically, Andorran women won 15 out of 28 in seats in the country's legislature during the parliamentary election of 2011. For this reason, Andorra became the first nation in Europe and the second country internationally to have elected a "majority female legislature".

Women's rights in Andorra 
Among the problems that confront Andorran women at present are the existence of violence against them, the absence of government departments that deal with issues about women, and the non-existence of shelters for battered women that are managed by the government of Andorra. Andorra was slow to give women legal rights: women's suffrage was achieved only in 1970.

See also 
 Human rights in Andorra

References

External links 

 ANDORRA
 Andorra
 GENDER EQUITY & WOMEN'S ISSUES – Andorra
 Women’s and Migrants Rights Issues Dominate UPR of Andorra
 2010 Human Rights Report: Andorra

 
Andorran women
Andorra